is a Japanese animation studio that was founded in 1986.

Productions

TV series 
 What's Michael? (1988-1989)
 D4 Princess (1999)
 Bubu Chacha (1999)
 I Love Bubu Chacha! (2001)
 Hanaukyo Maid Team series (2001–2004)
 Please Teacher! (2002)
 Please Twins! (2003)
 DearS (2004)
 Hanaukyō Maid Team: La Verite (2004)
 Strawberry Marshmallow (2005)
 Tona-Gura! (2006)
 Crescent Love (2006)
 Minami-ke (2007)
 Shiki (2010)

OVA 
 The Heroic Legend of Arslan (1993, episodes 3–4, with Pierrot)
 The Irresponsible Captain Tylor (1994, episode 1 only)
 Idol Fighter Su-Chi-Pai (1996)
 Debutante Detective Corps (1996)
 Sorcerer on the Rocks (1999)
 Hanaukyo Maid Team (2001)
 Please Teacher: Secret Couple (2002)
 Please Twins: The Summer Never Ends (2003)
 Ichigeki Sacchu!! HoiHoi-san (2004)
 Le Portrait de Petit Cossette (2004)
 Strawberry Marshmallow: Episode 0 (2005)
 DearS: Is It a Golden Ball? (2005)
 Koharu Biyori (2007)
 Strawberry Marshmallow (2007)
 Strawberry Marshmallow Encore (2009)
 Shiki (2011)

Video games
 Langrisser V (1998) - Opening animation
 BlazBlue: Central Fiction (2015) - Ending animation

Fate 
After the end of Shiki, Daume ceased the production of titles as a major studio. The studio began taking on sub-contracting works for other companies and, as of April 2016, have withdrawn from the animation production business.

References

External links 
 Official website 
 

Japanese animation studios
Mass media companies established in 1986
Japanese companies established in 1986
Animation studios in Tokyo
Suginami